The 1958 United States Senate election in Michigan was held on November 4, 1958. 

Incumbent Senator Charles E. Potter was defeated in his bid for re-election to a second term by Lieutenant Governor Philip A. Hart. This was one of a record twelve seats Democrats gained from the Republican Party.

Republican primary

Candidates
 Charles E. Potter, incumbent Senator

Results
Senator Potter was unopposed for re-nomination by the Republican Party.

Democratic primary

Candidates
 Philip Hart, Lieutenant Governor of Michigan
 Homer Martin, former UAW President

Results

Independents and third parties

Prohibition
 Elmer H. Ormiston

Socialist Labor
 James Sim, perennial candidate

Socialist Workers
 Evelyn Sell

General election

Results

See also 
 1958 United States Senate elections

References 

1958
Michigan
United States Senate